Jastrzębniki  is a village in the administrative district of Gmina Sławoborze, within Świdwin County, West Pomeranian Voivodeship, in north-western Poland.

Notable residents
 Reinhold Wulle (1882-1950), politician

References

Villages in Świdwin County